Kanagawa's 17th district is a single-member constituency of the House of Representatives, the lower house of the national Diet of Japan.

Members 

 Karen Makishima

See also 

 List of districts of the House of Representatives of Japan

References 

Districts of the House of Representatives (Japan)
1994 establishments in Japan
Constituencies established in 1994
Politics of Kanagawa Prefecture